Francesco Guicciardini (5 October 1851 – 1 September 1915) was an Italian politician. He was born in Florence. He served as minister of agriculture, commerce and industry from 1896 to 1897 in the cabinet of Prime Minister Antonio Starabba, Marchese di Rudinì. He served as Foreign Minister of the Kingdom of Italy in the cabinets of Prime Minister Sidney Sonnino.

See also
 List of Italians

References

External links
 

1851 births
1915 deaths
Mayors of Florence
19th-century Italian politicians
20th-century Italian politicians